Chiang Mai Flower Festival is an annual event celebrating flowers and ornamental plants in Chiang Mai, Thailand. The festival lasts 3 days and begins at the first weekend of February to mark the end of the cool season. Yellow and white chrysanthemums, and damask roses, a variety of flower found only in Chiang Mai, are displayed.

Flower Festival parade
The Flower Festival Parade typically begins early Saturday morning, and can continue on into the afternoon or evening. The flower parade lines up along Charoen Muang Road, from the Nawarat Bridge to the train station. At 16:00 the parade starts and moves up Tha Phae Road to Tha Phae Gate. It then turns left and follows the moat around to Suan Buak Hat. Typically, the flower parade moves very slowly, and stops frequently. Western-style marching bands from local schools and local drumming groups are interspersed among the floats. Dancers in traditional costumes perform Thai dances, and often those taking part in the flower parade hand out flowers to the spectators.

Miss Chiang Mai Flower Festival
Many of the girls atop the decorated floats and carriages seen in the flower parade are candidates for the Miss Chiang Mai Flower Festival competition. By late afternoon the process of choosing the Chiang Mai Flower Festival Queen from these candidates begins, during which a party takes place where loud rock music is played and liquid refreshments are served. This goes on until the evening, when the Flower Festival Queen is chosen.

External links
Thailand Festivals & Events
Chiang Mai Flower Festival, Chiang Mai Best
Chiang Mai Flower Festival, Festivals of Thailand

Festivals_in_Thailand
Tourist attractions in Chiang Mai
Flower festivals in Thailand